Hoai is a given name (Vietnamese have their surname first, followed by their given name). Notable people with this given name include:

 Phạm Thị Hoài (born 1960), Vietnamese writer, editor and translator
 Trần Văn Hoài (1929–2010), Vietnamese Roman Catholic prelate and activist

See also
HOAIC (not to be confused with Hoai)